4-Hydroxymandelic acid is a chemical compound used to synthesize atenolol. The compound typically occurs as a monohydrate.

Synthesis and occurrence
It is produced from 4-hydroxypyruvic acid by the action of the enzyme (S)-p-hydroxymandelate synthase:
HOC6H4CH2C(O)CO2H  +  O2   →    HOC6H4CH(OH)CO2H  +  CO2

4-Hydroxymandelic acid can be synthesized by the condensation reaction of phenol and glyoxylic acid:
HOC6H5  +  CHOCO2H   →    HOC6H4CH(OH)CO2H

See also
Vanillyl mandelic acid
4-Hydroxyphenylacetic acid

References 

Phenols
Acetic acids
Alpha hydroxy acids